Delia L. Smith is an American lawyer who serves as the United States attorney for the District Court of the Virgin Islands since May 2022.

Education

Smith received her Bachelor of Arts from the University of the Virgin Islands in 1993 and her Juris Doctor from the Texas Southern University School of Law in 1997.

Career

Smith served as a law clerk for Judge Ishmael Meyers on the United States Virgin Islands Superior Court from 1997 to 1999. From 1999 to 2005, she served as an assistant attorney general in the Office of the Attorney General for the Virgin Islands. From 2012 to 2014, she was detailed to work as a trial attorney in the United States Department of Justice’s Office of International Affairs. Since 2005, she has served as an Assistant United States Attorney for the United States Attorney's office for the District of the Virgin Islands.

U.S. attorney for the District of the Virgin Islands 

On September 28, 2021, President Joe Biden nominated Smith to be the United States attorney for the District Court of the Virgin Islands. Smith was recommended to the White House by Delegate Stacey Plaskett. Her nomination was supported by Governor Albert Bryan Jr. On February 10, 2022, her nomination was reported out of committee by voice vote. On April 27, 2022, her nomination was confirmed in the Senate by voice vote. She assumed office in May 2022.

References

External links

Living people
Year of birth missing (living people)
Place of birth missing (living people)
20th-century American women lawyers
20th-century American lawyers
21st-century American women lawyers
21st-century American lawyers
Assistant United States Attorneys
Texas Southern University alumni
United States Attorneys for the District of the Virgin Islands
United States Department of Justice lawyers
United States Virgin Islands lawyers
University of the Virgin Islands alumni